Christopher O'Leary (born 1 May 1997) is an Irish hurler who currently plays as a centre-back for the Dublin senior team.

Born in Innishannon, County Cork, O'Leary first played competitive hurling at Hamilton High School. Here he captained the senior hurling team in the Harty Cup. O'Leary later lined out with University College Cork.

O'Leary first appeared for the Valley Rovers club at juvenile and underage levels as a dual player, winning a county under-21 championship medal as a Gaelic footballer in 2015. He later joined the club's senior team while he also plays for divisional team Carrigdhoun.

O'Leary was seventeen when he was selected for the Cork minor team. He played for one championship season with the minor team. O'Leary subsequently joined the Cork under-21 team. By this stage he had also joined the Cork senior team after making his debut during the 2017 Munster League.

Career statistics

Club

Inter-county

Honours

University College Cork
Fitzgibbon Cup (1): 2019

Cork
All-Ireland Intermediate Hurling Championship (1): 2018
Munster Under-21 Hurling Championship (1): 2018

References

1997 births
Living people
Valley Rovers hurlers
Valley Rovers Gaelic footballers
UCC hurlers
Cork inter-county hurlers